Fernando Henríquez Betancor (March 27, 1956 – July 30, 2018) was a Spanish sprint canoer who competed in the late 1970s. He was eliminated in the semifinals of the K-1 1000 m event at the 1976 Summer Olympics in Montreal.

References
Fernando Henríquez' profile at Sports Reference.com
Fernando Henríquez's obituary 

1956 births
2018 deaths
Canoeists at the 1976 Summer Olympics
Olympic canoeists of Spain
Spanish male canoeists